Banffshire was a constituency represented in the Parliament of Scotland until 1707.

Members of Parliament

References

Politics of the county of Banff
Constituencies of the Parliament of Scotland (to 1707)
1593 establishments in Scotland
Constituencies established in 1593
Constituencies disestablished in 1707
1707 disestablishments in Scotland